Bôtchô is a cream sold in Côte d'Ivoire allegedly to increase breast and buttock size, which has become increasingly popular due to the Bobaraba (big bottom) dance.

Bôtchô is also the title of an album by the Ivorian band Tchagbazu Boys.

References

Biologically-based therapies
Ointments
Buttocks
Breast